The revised Ampera Cabinet was an Indonesian Cabinet which served under Acting President Suharto from October 1967 until June 1968. In addition to the Acting Presidency, Suharto was also Minister of Defense and Security in this Cabinet.

Acting President
Acting President/Minister of Defense and Security: Gen. Suharto

Departmental Ministers
Minister of Home Affairs: Lt. Gen. Basuki Rahmat
Minister of Foreign Affairs: Adam Malik
Minister of Justice: Umar Seno Aji
Minister of Information: B. M. Diah
Minister of Education and Culture: Sanusi Hardjadinata
Minister of Religious Affairs: M. Dahlan
Minister of Health: G. A. Siwabessy
Minister of Manpower: Brig. Gen. Awaluddin Djamin
Minister of Social Affairs: Albert Mangaratua Tambunan
Minister of Finance: Frans Seda
Minister of Trade: Maj. Gen. M Jusuf
Minister of Agriculture: Maj. Gen. Sutjipto
Minister of Plantations: Thayeb Hadiwidjaja
Minister of Transportation: Air Commodore Sutopo
Minister of Maritime Affairs: Rear Admiral Jatidjan
Minister of Public Works: Sutami
Minister of Basic Industries, Light Industries and Energy: Maj. Gen. Ashari Danudirjo
Minister of Textile and Handicraft Industries: Sanusi
Minister of Mines: Sumantri Brodjonegoro
Minister of Transmigration, Veteran Affairs and Mobilization: Lt. Gen. Sarbini

State Ministers
State Minister of Economics, Finance, and Industry: Hamengkubuwono IX
State Minister of People's Welfare: Idham Chalid

References

External links
 

Transition to the New Order
Cabinets of Indonesia
1967 establishments in Indonesia
1968 disestablishments in Indonesia
Cabinets established in 1967
Cabinets disestablished in 1968